The Tubulinea are a major grouping of Amoebozoa, including most of the more familiar amoebae genera like Amoeba, Arcella, Difflugia and Hartmannella.

Characteristics
During locomotion most Tubulinea have a roughly cylindrical form or produce numerous cylindrical pseudopods. Each cylinder advances by a single central stream of cytoplasm, granular in appearance, and has no subpseudopodia. This distinguishes them from other amoeboid groups, although in some members this is not the normal type of locomotion.

Classification
This class was anticipated by some biologists such as Jahn, who grouped all amoebae with granular pseudopodia together, but most split the lobose amoebae into testate Testacealobosia and naked Gymnamoebia. These latter are polyphyletic, but molecular trees by Bolivar et al. identified a core monophyletic subgroup.  Subsequent studies showed the testate lobose amoebae belong to the same group, which was thus renamed Lobosea sensu stricto or Tubulinea.

Taxonomy
Class Tubulinea Smirnov et al. 2005 stat. nov. Adl et al. 2018
 Subclass Corycidia Kang et al. 2017 stat. nov. Adl et al. 2018
 Order Trichosida Moebius 1889
 Family Trichosphaeriidae Sheehan & Banner 1973a
 Family Microcoryciidae de Saedeleer 1934
 Subclass Echinamoebia Cavalier-Smith 2016 stat. nov. Adl et al. 2018
 Order Echinamoebida Cavalier-Smith 2004 em. 2011
 Family Vermamoebidae Cavalier-Smith & Smirnov 2011
 Family Echinamoebidae Page 1975
 Subclass Elardia Kang et al. 2017 stat. nov. Adl et al. 2018
 Superorder Leptomyxia Cavalier-Smith 2016
 Order Leptomyxida Pussard & Pons 1976 em. Page 1987
 Family Flabellulidae Bovee & Jahn, 1967 ex Bovee 1970
 Family Gephyramoebidae Pussard & Pons 1976
 Family Leptomyxidae Goodey 1915
 Superorder Eulobosia Cavalier-Smith 2016
 Order Euamoebida Lepşi 1960 em. Cavalier-Smith 2016
 Family Nolandellidae Cavalier-Smith 2011
 Family Hartmannellidae Singh 1951 em. Smirnov et al. 2011
 Family Amoebidae (Ehrenberg 1838) Page 1987
 Order Arcellinida Kent 1880
 Family Bipseudostomatidae Snegovaya & Alekperov 2005
 Family Mississippiellidae Huddleston & Haman 1985
 Family Shamkiriidae Snegovaya & Alekperov 2005
 Suborder Phryganellina Bovee 1985
 Family Phryganellidae Jung 1942
 Family Cryptodifflugiidae Jung 1942
 Suborder Organoconcha Kosakyan et al. 2016
 Family Microchlamyiidae Ogden 1985
 Suborder Glutinoconcha Kosakyan et al. 2016
 Infraorder Volnustoma Kosakyan et al. 2016
 Family Heleoperidae Jung 1942
 Infraorder Hyalospheniformis Kosakyan et al. 2016
 Family Hyalospheniidae Jung, 1942 [Nebelidae Taranek 1882]
 Infraorder Excentrostoma Kosakyan et al. 2016
 Family Centropyxidae 
 Family Plagiopyxidae 
 Infraorder Longithecina Kosakyan et al. 2016
 Family Lesquereusiidae  [Paraquadrulidae Deflandre 1953]
 Family Difflugiidae Wallich 1864
 Infraorder Sphaerothecina Kosakyan et al. 2016
 Family Cucurbitellidae Gomaa et al. 2017
 Family Distomatopyxidae Bonnet 1970
 Family Lamtopyxidae Bonnet 1974
 Family Netzeliidae Kosakyan et al. 2016 [Cyclopyxidae Schönborn 1989]
 Family Arcellidae Ehrenberg 1832
 Family Trigonopyxidae Loeblich 1964

References 

 
Amoebozoa classes